Alexandra Rose Raisman (born May 25, 1994) is a retired American artistic gymnast and two-time Olympian. She was captain of both the 2012 "Fierce Five" and 2016 "Final Five" U.S. women's Olympic gymnastics teams, which won their respective team competitions.

At the 2012 Olympics in London, she won gold medals in the team and floor competitions, as well as the bronze medal on the balance beam, making her the most decorated American gymnast at the Games. At the 2016 Olympics in Rio de Janeiro, she won a gold medal in the team event, making her and teammate Gabby Douglas the only Americans with back-to-back team gold medals. Raisman also won silver medals in the individual all-around and for floor exercise. She is the third-most decorated American gymnast in Olympic history behind Shannon Miller and Simone Biles, with six Olympic medals.

Raisman was also a member of the gold-winning American teams at the 2011 and 2015 World Championships, and the world bronze medalist on floor exercise in 2011. She is also a two-time national champion on floor exercise (2012, 2015), the 2012 national champion on balance beam, and a five-time medalist in the all-around at the national championships (silver in 2016, bronze in 2010, 2011, 2012, and 2015). In 2013, she was inducted into the International Jewish Sports Hall of Fame.

Early life and training
Raisman was born on May 25, 1994, in the Boston suburb of Needham, Massachusetts, to Lynn (née Faber), a former high school gymnast, and Rick Raisman. She has three younger siblings: Brett, Chloe, and Madison. Raisman is Jewish, and has said, "I take a lot of pride in being able to not only represent the U.S.A, but also the Jewish community everywhere."

Raisman began gymnastics when she was eighteen months old. She attributes her initial love for the sport to the "Magnificent Seven", the gold-medal-winning U.S. women's team at the 1996 Summer Olympics, whose performances she watched on VHS.

She trained at Exxcel Gymnastics and Climbing through Level 8, when she moved to Brestyan's American Gymnastics Club under coaches Mihai and Silvia Brestyan. Raisman graduated from Needham High School in 2012, after completing her senior year via online classes while training for the Olympics.

2009
In April, Raisman competed at the American Classic in San Diego, where she placed tenth in the all-around with a score of 53.383. In July, she competed at the U.S. Classic in Des Moines, Iowa, and placed twelfth in the all-around with a score of 54.050.

In August, Raisman competed at the National Championships in Dallas. She placed third in the all-around with a two-day combined score of 112.600. In event finals, she placed fifth on vault, scoring 29.650 over two days, and second on balance beam, scoring 28.950.

In November, she competed at the Junior Pan American Championships in Aracaju, Brazil, where she contributed scores of 14.950 on vault and 14.050 on floor exercise toward the American team's first-place finish. Individually, she placed third in the all-around (56.200), and first on vault (14.700) and floor (14.400).

Senior career

2010
In March, Raisman competed at the American Cup in Worcester, Massachusetts. She placed second with an all-around score of 58.900. Later that month, she competed at the City of Jesolo Trophy in Jesolo, Italy, and won the all-around with a score of 57.650.

In May, she competed at the Pacific Rim Championships in Melbourne. She helped the American team win the gold medal and placed second in the all-around competition with a score of 58.250. In event finals, she placed seventh on uneven bars, scoring 13.025; second on balance beam, scoring 14.675; and second on floor, scoring 14.625.

In July, Raisman placed fifth at the U.S. Classic in Chicago with a score of 55.700. In August, she competed at the National Championships in Hartford, Connecticut, and placed third in the all-around with a two-day combined score of 115.650. In event finals, she placed third on balance beam, scoring 28.300, and third on floor, scoring 29.500.

In October, she competed at the 2010 World Artistic Gymnastics Championships in Rotterdam. She contributed scores of 15.066 on vault, 14.333 on balance beam, and 14.500 on floor toward the American team's second-place finish. Individually, she placed thirteenth in the all-around final with a score of 55.699, and fourth in the floor final with a score of 14.716.

2011
In March, Raisman placed third at the American Cup in Jacksonville, Florida, with a score of 58.565. Later that month, she placed third at the City of Jesolo Trophy with a score of 57.400.

In July, she won the all-around at the U.S. Classic in Chicago with a score of 57.250. In August, she competed at the National Championships in Saint Paul, Minnesota, and placed third in the all-around with a two-day combined score of 114.600. In event finals, she placed sixth on balance beam (27.900) and third on floor (29.150).

In October, Raisman competed at the 2011 World Artistic Gymnastics Championships in Tokyo. She became team captain when Sacramone was injured before the competition. "I'm the oldest of all my siblings, so it just kind of came naturally," she said. "I didn't really think of it as being the team leader; I just wanted to help the others out." She contributed scores of 14.950 on vault, 14.866 on balance beam, and 14.666 on floor toward the American team's first-place finish. Individually, she placed fourth in the all-around with a score of 57.558. In event finals, she placed fourth on balance beam, scoring 15.066, and third on floor, scoring 15.000. Here Raisman became famous for her first tumbling pass (round off one and a half step out round off back handspring tucked Arabian double front to punch front layout (punch front tuck during 2011), due to both its originality and high degree of difficulty.

In November, Raisman decided to become a professional athlete, giving up her NCAA eligibility and a scholarship to University of Florida. She signed with the Octagon sports management firm. She said: "It was a hard decision, but I've always thought about it in the back of my mind. I just wanted to try it and have no regrets, because I thought if I didn't try to go pro, I'd always wonder. I know all the girls at Florida, and they love it there so much. But not a lot of people get the opportunity to be a professional gymnast and be able to have sponsors. I love fashion, so it's cool to be sponsored by Ralph Lauren."

2012

At the beginning of March, Raisman competed at the American Cup in New York City, placing second with a score of 60.823. At the end of March, she competed at the City of Jesolo Trophy, where she finished second with a score of 59.050.

In May, she competed at the U.S. Classic in Chicago and won the all-around with a score of 60.350. National Team Coordinator Márta Károlyi said: "I was very impressed by Raisman's general manner of how she handled this competition. You could not tell that she feels any pressure, and we really, really need that. At the Olympics…we need the girls to believe that they're ready, and then they are successful, so that was very good."

In June, Raisman competed at the National Championships in St. Louis. She placed third in the all-around with a two-day combined score of 120.950, and finished first on beam (30.650) and floor (31.250). Károlyi said: "She is just so solid. She goes out there and doesn't act like she's bothered by anything. She knows she's trained, she knows she's ready, and she doesn't put any extra pressure on herself. I really love to have this kind of gymnast. She gives her heart." Sacramone added: "I don't think she necessarily gets enough credit for how well she competes. At the last two world championships, I don't think she's made any mistakes. She's the backbone. If you want her to go and do something, do a solid routine, she's going to do it."

At the beginning of July, Raisman placed third all-around at the Olympic Trials in San Jose, California, with a two-day combined score of 120.950. She placed first on balance beam (30.350) and floor (31.100). Afterward, she was chosen as a member of the team that would be sent to the 2012 Summer Olympics. Raisman was the oldest at 18 and named captain of the team.

In July, Raisman was the focus of a documentary on Comcast SportsNet titled Aly Raisman: Quest for Gold. She was filmed for nine months, from the 2011 World Championships until the Olympic Trials. Along with the rest of the U.S. women's Olympic gymnastics team, she was featured on the cover of the July 18, 2012, issue of Sports Illustrated. This was the first time an entire Olympic gymnastics team had been featured on the magazine's cover.

London Olympics
At the end of July, Raisman competed at the Olympics in London. She helped the American team (nicknamed the "Fierce Five") qualify in first place to the team final, and also qualified in second place to the individual all-around with a score of 60.391, fifth to the beam final with a score of 15.100, and first to the floor final with a score of 15.325. In the team final, she contributed scores of 14.933 on balance beam and 15.300 on floor toward the American team's first-place finish.

In the individual all-around, she scored a 15.900 on vault, 14.333 on bars, 14.200 on beam and 15.133 on floor for a total of 59.566, tying with Aliya Mustafina of Russia. However, she lost the bronze in a tie-breaker and placed fourth. (The tie-breaker counted the three highest apparatus scores; Mustafina's totaled 45.933 and Raisman's totaled 45.366.)

In the balance beam final, Raisman won the bronze medal. She initially scored 14.966, but after Károlyi requested a video review, the judges re-evaluated and granted Raisman's routine an extra tenth in difficulty. As a result, she scored 15.066, matching Romania's Cătălina Ponor for third place, and won the tie-breaker, which prioritized execution score over difficulty score.

In the floor final, Raisman placed first with a score of 15.600, becoming the first American woman to win a gold medal on floor. It was also the highest score on floor exercise recorded at a major international competition in the 2009-2012 Olympic quad. She performed to the tune of "Hava Nagila" and dedicated her floor routine to the 11 Israeli Olympians who were killed by Palestinian terrorists at the 1972 Summer Olympics in Munich.

Post-Olympics

In September 2012, Raisman was injured during the Kellogg's Tour of Gymnastics Champions in Ontario, California. She fell while performing a Maloney on the uneven bars and landed off the mats, bruising her knees. This occurred shortly after teammate McKayla Maroney injured herself performing a flyaway dismount on the same bars.

Raisman was given the honor of igniting the 2013 Maccabiah Games flame in Jerusalem. Raisman attended Babson College in Wellesley, Massachusetts in 2013 before returning to her professional career.

In 2014, Raisman returned to gymnastics at the October national training camp, her first since the Olympics. Longtime coach Mihai Brestyan had Raisman do a year of conditioning before allowed her to return to the apparatus. After the November training camp, she was named again to the U.S. National Team, along with Olympic teammate Gabby Douglas.

2015
Raisman made her comeback to competition at the City of Jesolo Trophy in late March. There, she received the gold medal with the U.S. team and won individual bronze medals in the all-around (behind Simone Biles and Bailie Key), with a score of 59.100, and the floor exercise (behind Biles and Erika Fasana of Italy), with a score of 14.850.

In June, she was named to the board of Boston's bid committee for the 2024 Summer Olympics.

On July 25, Raisman competed at the U.S. Classic. She performed her Amanar vault for the first time since 2012 and scored a 15.400. She placed ninth on bars (14.200), second on beam (15.100), and fifth on floor, where she fell during a new, difficult routine and scored 14.350. She finished fifth in the all-around with a total score of 59.050.

On August 13 and 15, Raisman competed at the National Championships in Indianapolis and finished third, behind Biles and Maggie Nichols, with a two-night total of 118.550. She fell on balance beam on Night 1, scoring a low 13.750, but went on to post the highest floor exercise score of the night, 15.550. With a two-night total of 31.050 on floor, she beat Biles, the reigning world champion on the event, by 0.300. After the competition, Raisman was named to the national team for the first time since 2012 and received an invitation to the World Championships selection camp in September.

2016
Raisman started the year at the 2016 City of Jesolo Trophy in March, and finished sixth in the all-around. She finished first on floor with a score of 15.050, beating teammate Ragan Smith by half a point. She also finished third on beam with a score of 14.750, behind Smith and Laurie Hernandez.

At the Pacific Rim Championships, Raisman won gold with the U.S. team, contributing a 15.200 on vault, 14.800 on beam, and 15.600 on floor. She then won the silver medal in the all-around, behind Biles, with a score of 59.900. She won a second silver medal on the balance beam (15.100), behind Smith, and gold on floor (15.100).

Raisman then won the U.S. Classic in Hartford with a score of 59.250. She placed first on vault (15.700) and floor (15.500); third on beam (15.000), behind Biles and Alyssa Baumann; and scored a 13.050 on uneven bars, finishing seventeenth on that event.

On June 24 and 26, Raisman competed at the National Championships. She scored 60.450 on the first night and 60.650 on the second, finishing in second place behind Biles. Her day one scores were 15.350 on vault, 14.150 on uneven bars, 15.350 on balance beam and 15.600 on floor. Her day two scores were 15.500 on vault, 14.150 on bars, 15.300 on beam and 15.700 on floor. She also placed second on beam and floor behind Biles, and twelfth on bars. At the Olympic Trials in July, she scored a total of 119.750 over two nights, putting her in third place behind Biles and Hernandez. She placed second on floor, third on vault and beam, and eleventh on bars. After the Trials, she was named to the 2016 U.S. Olympic women's gymnastics team alongside Biles, Douglas, Hernandez, and Madison Kocian. Raisman and Douglas are the first U.S. women since 2000 to make back-to-back Olympic gymnastics teams. Raisman was again the oldest and named captain of the team.

Rio de Janeiro Olympics

 There was some question heading into the women's qualifications which of Aly Raisman, Laurie Hernandez, and defending Olympic all-around champion Gabby Douglas would get a chance to qualify for the all-around finals, since the first spot in the finals was previously given to Simone Biles. Douglas, despite trailing Raisman and Hernandez in the all-around throughout the year, was considered very strong on the uneven bars, the event that someone would be required to sit out to make way for bars specialist Madison Kocian.  Due to her weakness on uneven bars many speculated Raisman would be the one to miss out on an all-around opportunity but her strong performances in podium training on all events, and an injury to Laurie Hernandez, meant it would be Hernandez to sit out uneven bars, giving Raisman the chance to qualify to the all-around.  During the first night of women's gymnastics competition at the 2016 Summer Olympics, Raisman and the U.S. women qualified into the team final in first place with a score of 185.238, almost 10 points ahead of the second-place qualifying team. Individually, Raisman qualified second to the all-around final (with a score of 60.607, behind teammate Biles), just edging out defending Olympic all-around winner Douglas who placed third behind Raisman but was bumped due to the two-per-country rule.   Raisman also qualified to the floor exercise final (with a score of 15.275, again behind Biles), where she was the defending Olympic champion from the London Games. She also posted one of the highest beam scores in qualification, an event she was the defending Olympic bronze medalist, but due to the two-per-country rule was bumped from event finals by her teammates Simone Biles and Laurie Hernandez.

On the second day of competition in the team final, Raisman competed on vault, balance beam, and floor exercise to help secure the gold medal for the U.S. team and defend the title she earned with the Fierce Five in 2012. Individually, she scored 15.833 on vault, 15.000 on beam and 15.366 on floor. At the end of the competition, she and her teammates dubbed themselves "The Final Five", because they were the last Olympic team Marta Karolyi would name before she retired as team coordinator. These were the last Olympics where the teams would consist of five gymnasts, as it was announced earlier in the year that, starting with the 2020 Olympics in Tokyo, that competing teams would be reduced to four gymnasts.

In the all-around final, Raisman scored a 15.633 on vault, 14.166 on bars, 14.866 on beam and 15.433 on floor to place second with a total score of 60.098, earning a silver medal, behind Biles and ahead of Russia's Aliya Mustafina. She was most noted for bursting into tears after the completion of her floor routine in the final rotation, having avenged the heartbreak of losing an all-around medal via a tiebreak four years earlier.

In the floor final, Raisman again finished second behind Biles, with a score of 15.500, bringing her to a total of six Olympic medals. This made her the second most decorated American Olympic gymnast behind Shannon Miller. Raisman received praise for her dignity and maturity as well as for her performances, which had improved from 2012.

Personal life

Raisman is Jewish with roots in Romania. In 2016, she joined UNICEF Kid Power as a brand ambassador Kid Power Champion.

In November 2017, Raisman came forward as one of the many victims sexually abused by the former Olympic team physician, Larry Nassar, starting from the age of 15. On January 19, 2018, Raisman was one of several victims that read impact statements at Nassar's sentencing. On February 28, 2018, Raisman filed a lawsuit against USA Gymnastics and the USOC, claiming both organizations "knew or should have known" about the ongoing abuse. On May 16, 2018, it was announced that Raisman and the other survivors of the USA Gymnastics sexual abuse scandal would be awarded the Arthur Ashe Courage Award. On May 30, 2018, Raisman appeared in the Maroon 5 music video "Girls Like You" featuring Cardi B, wearing a T-shirt with the words "Always Speak Your Truth".

Dancing with the Stars
Raisman was a contestant on season 16 of Dancing With the Stars and finished in fourth place with two-time champion Mark Ballas. She was credited as "Alexandra Raisman" during the competition.

She also made an appearance with the rest of the Fierce Five during the previous season of DWTS, when she appeared during a freestyle dance with 2008 Olympic gold medal winner Shawn Johnson and Johnson's partner that season, Derek Hough.

Performances

Other media appearances
Raisman and fellow Olympic teammate Simone Biles appeared in the 2017 Sports Illustrated Swimsuit Issue.  Raisman also participated in the 2018 edition to show empowerment for women following the Nassar abuse scandal.

In November 2017, Raisman released her memoir book Fierce: How Competing for Myself Changed Everything.

In November 2019, Raisman had a cameo in the Charlie's Angels reboot film, written and directed by Elizabeth Banks.

On September 24, 2021, Aly Raisman: Darkness to Light advocates for survivors of abuse, on Lifetime.

Selected competitive skills

Competitive history

Bibliography
 Fierce: How competing for myself changed everything (Little, Brown, 2017)

Filmography

Film

Television

Music videos

See also
 List of select Jewish gymnasts
 List of Olympic female gymnasts for the United States

References

External links

 
 
 
 
 
 
 
 

1994 births
American female artistic gymnasts
American people of Romanian-Jewish descent
Competitors at the 2013 Maccabiah Games
Gymnasts at the 2012 Summer Olympics
Gymnasts at the 2016 Summer Olympics
International Jewish Sports Hall of Fame inductees
Jewish American sportspeople
Jewish gymnasts
Living people
Maccabiah Games gymnasts
Medalists at the 2012 Summer Olympics
Medalists at the 2016 Summer Olympics
Medalists at the World Artistic Gymnastics Championships
Olympic bronze medalists for the United States in gymnastics
Olympic gold medalists for the United States in gymnastics
Olympic silver medalists for the United States in gymnastics
Sportspeople from Needham, Massachusetts
Gymnasts from Massachusetts
U.S. women's national team gymnasts
Shorty Award winners
21st-century American Jews
21st-century American women